Johann Philipp Kirnberger (also Kernberg; 24 April 1721, Saalfeld – 27 July 1783, Berlin) was a musician, composer (primarily of fugues), and music theorist. He was a student of Johann Sebastian Bach.

According to Ingeborg Allihn, Kirnberger played a significant role in the intellectual and cultural exchange between Germany and Poland in the mid-18th century (Allihn 1995, 209). Between 1741 and 1751 Kirnberger lived and worked in Poland for powerful magnates including Lubomirski, Poninski, and Rzewuski before ending up at the Benedictine Cloister in Lviv (then part of Poland). He spent much time collecting Polish national dances and compiled them in his treatise Die Charaktere der Taenze (Allihn 1995, 211).

Kirnberger became a violinist at the court of Frederick II of Prussia in 1751. He was the music director to the Prussian Princess Anna Amalia from 1758 until his death.

Kirnberger greatly admired Johann Sebastian Bach, deeming him "the greatest of all composers." Kirnberger published Bach's Clavierübungen mit der bachischen Applicatur in the 1760s, and seeking to secure the publication of all of Bach's chorale settings, which finally appeared after Kirnberger's death; see Kirnberger chorale preludes (BWV 690–713). Many of Bach's manuscripts have been preserved in Kirnberger's library (the "Kirnberger collection").

Kirnberger is known today primarily for his theoretical work Die Kunst des reinen Satzes in der Musik (The Art of Strict Composition in Music, 1774, 1779). The well-tempered tuning systems known as "Kirnberger II" and "Kirnberger III" are associated with his name (see Kirnberger temperament), as is a rational version of equal temperament (see schisma). One of his most familiar compositions is Fuga in C-dur für Orgel ("Fanfare" Fugue), which was formerly attributed to Johann Sebastian Bach and then to his son Carl Philipp Emanuel Bach.

References

External links
 More information, including full text, of Kirnberger's Grundsätze des Generalbasses (178?) in the University of North Texas Music Library Virtual Rare Book Room
 
 Larry Schou: The Kirnberger Chorales, The University of Michigan School of Music, Theatre & Dance
 https://www.academia.edu/5210832/18th_Century_Quotes_on_J.S._Bach_s_Temperament

1721 births
1783 deaths
People from Saalfeld
German male classical composers
German Classical-period composers
German music theorists
Pupils of Johann Sebastian Bach
18th-century classical composers
18th-century German male musicians